The 1988–89 FIBA European Cup Winners' Cup was the twenty-third edition of FIBA's 2nd-tier level European-wide professional club basketball competition, contested between national domestic cup champions. It took place between 11 October 1988 and 14 March 1989. The final was played at the Peace and Friendship Stadium, in Piraeus, Greece, by Real Madrid of the Spanish League, and Snaidero Caserta of the Italian League.

Participants

First round

|}

Eighth-finals

|}

Quarterfinals

Semifinals

|}

Final
March 14, Peace and Friendship Stadium, Piraeus, Greece

|}

References

External links
 1988–89 FIBA European Cup Winner's Cup @ linguasport.com
FIBA European Cup Winner's Cup 1988–89

FIBA Saporta Cup
FIBA
Sports competitions in Piraeus